"Peaches" is a punk rock single by the Stranglers, from their debut studio album Rattus Norvegicus (1977). Notable for its distinctive bassline, the track peaked at No. 8 in the UK Singles Chart.

Song information
The lyrics to "Peaches" featured coarse sexual language and innuendo to a degree that was unusual for the time. The song's narrator is girl-watching on a crowded beach one hot summer day. It is never made clear if his lascivious thoughts (such as "there goes a girl and a half") are an interior monologue, comments to his mates, or come-on lines to the attractive women in question. The critic Tom Maginnis wrote that Hugh Cornwell sings with "a lecherous sneer, the sexual tension is so unrelenting as to spill into macho parody or even censor-baiting territory".
The single was a double A-side with pub rock song "Go Buddy Go".  The latter was played on UK radio at the time and also was performed on the band's first BBC TV Top of the Pops appearance, because the sexual nature of the lyrics of "Peaches" caused the BBC to censor it. Still, "Peaches" was ranked at No. 18 among the top "Tracks of the Year" for 1977 by NME, and it reached No. 8 in the UK Singles Chart. The radio cut was re-recorded with less explicit lyrics: "clitoris" was replaced with "bikini", "oh shit" with "oh no" and "what a bummer" with "what a summer". The catalogue number of the radio version was FREE 4.

Legacy
In a 2022 feature, Guitar World named "Peaches" as having the 4th best bassline of all time.

An edited version of "Peaches", minus the lyrics, was used as the closing theme tune to many of the TV chef Keith Floyd's Floyd on... television shows. It was also used as the title music in the opening sequence of 2000 British film Sexy Beast and during a party scene in the 1997 film Metroland. The song is also on the soundtrack of the video game Driver: Parallel Lines (2006). It was used by Adidas in advertising in the Netherlands in 2002.

The song is used in episode 16 of the BBC series Being Human, when the hungry "teenage" vampire Adam stalks three teenage girls into a game arcade.

The song is heard in episode nine of series two of the TV series Gotham, the opening sequence of a 2006 Hollyoaks episode, and the 2011 film Killer Elite.

Dub Pistols covered the song on their 2007 album, Speakers and Tweeters, with Rodney P on guest MC vocals and Terry Hall of the Specials singing the chorus. Audio Bullys and Liam Howlett included it in their installment of the Back to Mine series of "after hours grooving" DJ mix albums, with Simon Franks of the duo referring to it as "raw UK old school".

The single was re-issued, with "Go Buddy Go", on green vinyl and with a new sleeve for the 2014 Record Store Day.

Charts

Personnel
The Stranglers
Hugh Cornwell - lead vocals, guitar
Jet Black - drums
Jean-Jacques Burnel - bass guitar, backing vocals
Dave Greenfield - keyboards, backing vocals

References

External links

The Stranglers songs
1977 singles
Song recordings produced by Martin Rushent
1977 songs
United Artists Records singles
Controversies in the United Kingdom
Obscenity controversies in music
Songs written by Hugh Cornwell
Songs written by Jean-Jacques Burnel
Songs written by Dave Greenfield
Songs written by Jet Black
Songs banned by the BBC